Qu Qiubai (29 January 1899 – 18 June 1935) was a leader of the Chinese Communist Party in the late 1920s. He was born in Changzhou, Jiangsu, China.

Early life
Qu was born in Changzhou, Jiangsu. His family lived in Tianxiang Lou located on Qingguo Lane. Qu's father, Qu Shiwei, was born in a family that was once powerful. He was good at painting and fencing and acquired much medical knowledge, but had no interest in politics and business. Qu's mother, Jin Xuan, the daughter of an elite government official, was skilled in poetry. Qu had five brothers and one sister, he being the eldest. When Qu was young, his family lived in his uncle's house and was supported financially by relatives. Though Qu's father took a job as teacher, he was not able to support his family due to his addiction to opium. In 1915, Qu's mother, overcome by her life's mounting difficulties and debts, committed suicide.

In 1916, Qu went to Hankou (today Wuhan) and entered Wuchang Foreign Language School to learn English with the support of his cousin. In the spring of 1917, Qu went to Beiping (today Beijing) to apply for a job, but did not pass the general civil service examination. Not having enough money to pay for a regular university tuition, Qu enrolled in the newly established Russian Language Institute under the Chinese Ministry of Foreign Affairs, since it did not require payment of fee. The institute also offered a stipend and promised him a job upon graduation.

Communist Party involvement
Qu worked hard in the language institute, learning both French and Russian and spending his spare time studying Buddhist philosophy and classical Chinese. Both were his interests cultivated since childhood, as well as the works of Bertrand Russell whose discussion of physics and perception was to Qu similar to the teachings of Buddhism.

His earliest contacts with revolutionary circles came when he participated in discussions of Marxist analysis hosted by Li Dazhao at Beijing University, who was the campus' head librarian. The future communist leader and CCP chairman Mao Zedong was also present at these meetings. Qu later took a job as a journalist for a Beiping newspaper Morning News and was sent to Moscow as a correspondent, even though this would jeopardise a career in the civil service which his earlier training had prepared him for. Qu was one of the first Chinese to report from Moscow about life in Russia during and after the Bolshevik Revolution, where he observed the harshness of living conditions. While in Russia, he also visited Leo Tolstoy's home at Yasnaya Polyana with Tolstoy's granddaughter Sofya, saw Lenin addressing a group of delegates, heard Feodor Chaliapin sing Alexander Pushkin's poems set to music, and witnessed Pyotr Kropotkin's funeral.

In January 1923, Qu accepted the invitation from Chen Duxiu, leader of the Chinese Communist Party at that time, to come back from Russia to join in his cause. After returning, Qu was responsible for the propaganda work of Chinese Communist Party. In 1927 after the fall of Chen Duxiu, he became acting Chairman of the CCP Politburo and the de facto leader of the party. He organised actions such as the Guangzhou Uprising of December 11, 1927. In April 1928, Qu went to Moscow once again and worked as a delegate of the Chinese Communist Party for two years. In 1930, after being dismissed as Chinese Communist Party representative in Russia, Qu returned to China only to be also dismissed from the central leadership. This was all due to an intense argument over how the revolution should be carried out. Following his dismissal, Qu worked both as a writer and a translator in Shanghai, fought literary battles along with Mao Dun and Lu Xun and forged a profound friendship with leaders of the left-wing cultural movement.

Execution
In 1934, the situation became increasingly dangerous and Qu could not stay in Shanghai any longer, so he went to the Communists' Central Revolutionary Base Area in  Ruijin, Jiangxi province. When the Red Army began the famous Long March, Qu stayed in the south to lead the bush fighting. Arrested in Changting, Fujian in 1934, Qu was sentenced to death by Kuomintang a year later. During his arrest, Qu was tortured by the KMT government, who adopted various means to induce him to capitulate, but he was persistent in his beliefs and refused. On 18 June 1935, Qu walked calmly toward the execution place, Zhongshan Park in Changting, singing "The Internationale", the "Red Army Song", and shouting "Down with the Kuomintang", "Long live the Chinese Communist Party", "Long live communism" and other slogans. After reaching Luohanling, a small hill in Zhongshan Park, Qu chose a place to sit down on the grass, smiled and nodded to the executioner, saying "very good here!". Qu was only 36 when he was shot dead.

During his arrest, Qu wrote a book named Superfluous Words to express his political thinking and traced his change from a literatus to a revolutionist. The book stirred a controversy after his death.

Legacy
Qu was heavily criticised as a "renegade" during the Cultural Revolution. However, the Central Committee absolved him in 1980 and today he is held in very high regard by the Chinese Communist Party. A Qu Qiubai museum stands in his native town of Changzhou. Tsi-an Hsia describes Qu in The Gate of Darkness: Studies on the Leftist Literary Movement in China (published 1968) as "the tenderhearted Communist". Qu and a Russian counterpart, V.S. Kolokolov, were responsible for the early development of the Sin Wenz system of Mandarin romanization. Qu also translated The Internationale into Chinese, with his version recognised as the official one and used as the anthem of the Chinese Communist Party. Qu was one of the major Chinese intellectuals to emerge from the May 4th Movement, and one of early Communist Party members who established the spirit of the revolutionary movement in China. He is also widely remembered as an emotive poet.

References

1899 births
1935 deaths
20th-century Chinese translators
20th-century executions by China
Burials at Babaoshan Revolutionary Cemetery
Chinese Communist Party politicians from Jiangsu
Chinese revolutionaries
Delegates to the 3rd National Congress of the Chinese Communist Party
Delegates to the 4th National Congress of the Chinese Communist Party
Delegates to the 5th National Congress of the Chinese Communist Party
Delegates to the 6th National Congress of the Chinese Communist Party
Executed people from Jiangsu
Executed Republic of China people
Heads of the Publicity Department of the Chinese Communist Party
Members of the Politburo Standing Committee of the Chinese Communist Party
Members of the 4th Central Executive Committee of the Chinese Communist Party
Members of the 6th Central Committee of the Chinese Communist Party
People executed by the Republic of China by firing squad
Politicians from Changzhou
Republic of China journalists
Republic of China translators
Russian–Chinese translators
Writers from Changzhou